Allandale Farm, also known as the John Harris House and Farm, and once as Faulkner Farm, is an historic farm at 284 Newton Street in Brookline and Boston, Massachusetts.  The main farm house, built c. 1778 and extensively remodeled in 1976, is one of Brookline's few 18th-century houses.  The farm is the last working farm in both communities; it was added to the National Register of Historic Places in 1985.

Description and history
Allandale Farm is located astride the border between eastern Brookline and the Jamaica Plain neighborhood on Boston's west side. It is bounded on the north by the Brandegee Estate, of which it was once a part. The farmstand that serves the public is located on Allandale Road, along with a cluster of greenhouses.

The interior of the farm property is accessed from the Brandegee Estate's main drive off Newton Street, and includes a cluster farm outbuildings, dating to the late 19th century, that have been converted to other uses.  The original farmhouse is set in a grove of trees, well back from the road.  It was built about 1778 by John Harris, whose family owned land in the area since at least 1655.  The house was extensively renovated in 1976, but elements of its 18th-century origins are still discernible.  The farmhouse was used by the estate caretaker when the property was part of the Brandegee Estate.  The farm is the last working farm in both communities, a reminder of the area's agrarian origins.

See also
National Register of Historic Places listings in Brookline, Massachusetts
National Register of Historic Places listings in southern Boston, Massachusetts

References

External links

Allandale Farm

Farms on the National Register of Historic Places in Massachusetts
Houses in Boston
Houses in Brookline, Massachusetts
National Register of Historic Places in Brookline, Massachusetts
National Register of Historic Places in Boston